Paolo Signorelli might refer to:

Paolo Signorelli (politician) (1934–2010), Italian politician
Paolo Signorelli (footballer) (1939–2018), Italian footballer